LISAA School of Art & Design, (L'Institut Supérieur des Arts Appliqués) is a French private institution for applied art education founded in 1986. LISAA has locations in Paris, Rennes, Nantes, Strasbourg, Bordeaux and Toulouse. The school is one of about 100 recognized by the French Ministry of Culture and communication. Diplomas are offered in graphic design, animation & video games, interior architecture & design, and fashion.

Key dates 
1986

Michel Glize, architect and entrepreneur founds LISAA.

2012

The school is sold to Galileo Global Education.

Teaching 
The main concentrations in the academic curriculum are graphic design, animation & video games, interior architecture & design, and fashion. Many programs last five years (bac+5), while some are shorter (bachelors, BTS, MANAA).

Foundation year 
Two one-year foundation courses are offered at LISAA:
 Introductory course in applied arts
 Foundation year in Architecture (preparatory class for schools of architecture)

Fashion courses 
Master and bachelor diplomas exist for the fashion industry:
 Master of Interior Decoration
 Master of Journalist, blogger, influencer fashion/beauty & luxury
 Master of Fashion Design & Business
 Two or three year course of Artistic make-up artist
 Bachelor (BTS) of Fashion Design / Pattern Making
 Bachelor (BTS) of Fashion Design / Textiles, materials, surfaces
 Bachelor (BTS) of Fashion Design / Textile Design
 Master of Fashion & Luxury Management

Interior architecture and design courses 
Master, bachelor diplomas are offered in the interior architecture and design field:
 Master of Interior Decoration
 Postgraduate program of Interior Architecture & Design (5 years)
 Foundation year in Architecture (preparatory class for schools of architecture in one year)
 Bachelor (BTS) of Interior Architecture
 Master of Interior Architecture & Connected Design
 Master of Interior Architecture & Service Design
 Master of Interior Architecture & Global Design

Animation and video games 
Bachelor, master diplomas are offered in the animation and video game field:
 MBA Video Game Production (1 year)
 Master Supervisor & Director Animation & Special Effects (2-year programme)
 Master of Video Game Creative Director
 Bachelor of 2-D/3-D Animation
 Bachelor of 2-D Animation
 Bachelor of 3-D Animation
 Bachelor of 2-D/3-D Video Games
 Bachelor of Visual Effects

Graphic and motion design 
Bachelor, master diplomas are offered in the graphic and motion design field:
 Bachelor (BTS) of  Graphic Design / Print
 Bachelor (BTS) of  Graphic Design / Digital Media
 Bachelor (BTS) of  Graphic Design
 Bachelor Motion Design
 Bachelor Graphic Design
 Master Digital Art Direction / Animated media
 Master Digital Art Direction / UX Design
 Master Digital Art Direction
 Master Art Direction for Creative & Cultural Industries

Partnerships

Academic partnerships 
LISAA has academic partnerships with schools in Europe or on the American continent:
 Helmo (Liège / Belgium)
 Vilnius College of Design (Vilnius / Lithuania)
 Thomas More Mechelen (Malines / Belgium)
 IED (Milan / Italy)
 IED (Madrid / Spain)
 IADE Instituto Superior de Design  (Lisbon / Portugal)
 VIA / The Netherlands
 KISD (Koln Germany)
 Hochschule (Trier Germany)
 Manchester Metropolitan University (UK)
 Abadir Academy (Italie)
 University of Applied Sciences MACROMEDIA
 Leeds College of Arts (UK)
 ARTCOM (Marocco)
 Nazareth College, Rochester, New York (USA)
 Universidad IEU - (Mexico)

Rankings 
The French student magazine "l'Étudiant"  and "Le Figaro Etudiant" regularly rank LISAA in the top schools in France in various fields of applied arts.

International 
LISAA School of Art & Design is a member of the international association CUMULUS. For the design course student exchanges are made with other schools of the international association of art & design universities CUMULUS. Ten percent of the cohort is of foreign origin.

Ownership 
The school was bought by the investment fund Galileo Global Education.

References

External links

Private universities and colleges in France
Art schools in France
Art schools in Paris
Design schools in France
Architecture schools in France
Industrial design
Education in Paris
Education in Île-de-France